Persicula porcellana is a species of sea snail, a marine gastropod mollusk, in the family Cystiscidae.

References

Porcellana
Gastropods described in 1791
Taxa named by Johann Friedrich Gmelin
Cystiscidae